The 2020 Portuguese Social Democratic Party leadership election was held on 11 and 18 January 2020. As no candidate received a majority of all valid votes on the first round, held on 11 January 2020, a second round took place one week later, 18 January, between the two candidates with the highest number of votes in the first round. This was the first time that a Social Democratic Party leadership election was contested on a second ballot.

In the first round of the election, incumbent party leader Rui Rio finished in first place with a relative majority of 49.0% of all valid votes cast, followed by contesters Luís Montenegro, who received 41.4% of the vote, and Miguel Pinto Luz, who won 9.6% of the vote. As no candidate managed to reach the required percentage of the vote to win outright in the first round, a run-off election took place between the two candidates with the most votes in the first round: Rio and Montenegro. Rui Rio won the second round with 53.2% of the vote and was thus re-elected President of the party and stayed on as Leader of the Opposition.

Candidates

Withdrawn candidates
Miguel Morgado, Member of Parliament for Porto (2015–2019)
Jorge Moreira da Silva, Minister of the Environment, Territorial Planning and Energy (2013–2015)

Opinion polls

All voters

Results

See also
 Social Democratic Party (Portugal)
 List of political parties in Portugal
 Elections in Portugal

References

External links
Election Results
Eleições Diretas 2020 Official website 
PSD Official Website

Political party leadership elections in Portugal
2020 elections in Portugal
January 2020 events in Portugal
Portuguese Social Democratic Party leadership election